The Standrod House, also known as the Stanrod Castle, is a historic house in Pocatello, Idaho. It was built in 1897 for Drew William Standrod, a judge, bank president, and Anti-Mormon. The house was designed in the Châteauesque architectural style. It has been listed on the National Register of Historic Places since January 18, 1973.

References

National Register of Historic Places in Bannock County, Idaho
Châteauesque architecture in the United States
Houses completed in 1897
1897 establishments in Idaho